C V Shivashankar Shastry also known as Chittanahalli Venkatakrishna Bhatta mononymously as C. V. Shivashankar (born 23 March 1933) is an Indian film director, screenwriter, producer, Lyricist and dialogue writer who predominantly works in Kannada film industry

Career 
C V Shivashankar began his career as an actor and assistant director from the Kannada movie Rathna Manjari. starring Udaykumar,  M. P. Shankar, Narasimharaju, Leelavathi and others. later he acted in few Kannada movies, and he become full-fledged director from the movie Padavidhara starring  Udaykumar, Kalpana, T. N. Balakrishna and Narasimharaju in the lead roles.

Filmography

Awards 
 1991 – Karnataka Rajyotsava Award by Government of Karnataka

References

External links 
 

1933 births
Living people
Indian film directors
Kannada film directors
Kannada film producers
Kannada-language lyricists
Kannada actors